Michael John Maskell (born November 24, 1966 in Bridgetown) is a Barbadian sport shooter. Maskell represented Barbados in five editions of the Olympic Games -- 1992, 1996, 2000, 2004 and 2016 -- having narrowly missed reaching the final podium twice in men's skeet shooting at both the 1999 and 2011 Pan American Games.

Twelve years after competing in his first Olympics, Maskell qualified for his fourth Barbadian team, as a 37-year-old, in men's skeet shooting at the 2004 Summer Olympics held in Athens by receiving a wild card place from ISSF through a re-allocation of unused quota. Building his own milestone as a four-time Olympian, Maskell was appointed by the Barbados Olympic Association to carry the nation's flag in the opening ceremony. After finishing twenty-fifth in Barcelona (1992) for mixed skeet, forty-ninth in Atlanta (1996), and twenty-third in Sydney (2000), his highest ever placement, Maskell did not improve his standard in the same program, as he hit a total of 117 targets to share a thirty-first-place finish with Chile's Jorge Atalah and Germany's Axel Wegner.

Olympic results

References

1966 births
Living people
Barbadian male sport shooters
Skeet shooters
Olympic shooters of Barbados
Shooters at the 1992 Summer Olympics
Shooters at the 1996 Summer Olympics
Shooters at the 2000 Summer Olympics
Shooters at the 2004 Summer Olympics
Shooters at the 2016 Summer Olympics
Pan American Games competitors for Barbados
Shooters at the 1999 Pan American Games
Shooters at the 2011 Pan American Games
Shooters at the 2015 Pan American Games
Commonwealth Games competitors for Barbados
Shooters at the 1990 Commonwealth Games
Shooters at the 1994 Commonwealth Games
Shooters at the 2002 Commonwealth Games
Shooters at the 2006 Commonwealth Games
Shooters at the 2018 Commonwealth Games
Sportspeople from Bridgetown
Shooters at the 2019 Pan American Games